William Woodbridge (August 8, 1819 – August 6, 1888) was an American physician and state legislator.

Woodbridge, fourth child of James R and Mary (Bull) Woodbridge, of Hartford, Connecticut, was born in Hartford, August 8, 1819.

He graduated from Yale College in 1840 and received his medical degree from Yale Medical School in 1844, and settling for practice in Manchester, Connecticut, whence he removed two or three years later to Brooklyn, Connecticut, where he continued until his death, on August 6, 1888, at the age of 69 years. During his long career in Brooklyn as a physician he was a leader in religious and civil affairs.  He represented the town in the Connecticut State Legislature in 1869.  He married, April 26, 1847, Mary Ann Bidwell, who died July 6, 1872, leaving two children. He next married, Sept 13, 1878, Abby B. Ensworth, of Canterbury, Connecticut, who survived him.

External links

1819 births
1888 deaths
Politicians from Hartford, Connecticut
Yale School of Medicine alumni
Members of the Connecticut General Assembly
19th-century American politicians
People from Brooklyn, Connecticut
Yale College alumni